Gobinda Chandra Naskar was a member of the 15th Lok Sabha. He was elected as a Trinamool Congress candidate from Bangaon. He was also member of West Bengal Legislative Assembly in 4 different terms. He is also chief of Trinamool Congress OBC Cell.Now he is the member of  legislative assembly of West Bengal.He is elected from Basanti constituency in 2016.

Pratima Mondal, his daughter, has been elected to the 16th Lok Sabha from Jaynagar.

References

1941 births
2022 deaths
India MPs 2009–2014
Trinamool Congress politicians from West Bengal
Jadavpur University alumni
Lok Sabha members from West Bengal
People from North 24 Parganas district